Tortefontaine is a commune in the Pas-de-Calais department in the Hauts-de-France region of France.

Geography
Tortefontaine lies southwest of Hesdin, on the D136 road with the Varnette, a small tributary of the Authie flowing through it.

Etymology
The name translates as twisted fountain.

Population
The inhabitants are called Tortefontainois.

Places and monuments
 The ruins of the abbey of Dommartin. First built in 1161, the ruins are found in farmland.
 17th / 18th century buildings and more ruins of the same.

See also
 Communes of the Pas-de-Calais department

References

Communes of Pas-de-Calais
Artois